Frans Juliaan Corneel De Bruyn (born in  Boom, 10 May 1924 - 29 October 2014) was a Flemish writer. De Bruyn was born in Boom, Belgium, in 1924.

Bibliography
 Tekens in steen (1955) 
 De regen schuilt in ons (1956) 
 Die hemel is ons huis (1958) 
 De zeven heuvelen van Rome (1961) 
 Een hobbelpaard voor Hansje (1962) 
 Elke vrijdag vis (1963) 
 De holbewoners (1965) 
 The literary genres of Edmund Burke (1996) 
 Mensen in het circus

Awards
 1956 - Arkprijs van het Vrije Woord

See also
 Flemish literature

References

Sources
 Frans De Bruyn
 Frans De Bruyn
 G.J. van Bork en P.J. Verkruijsse, De Nederlandse en Vlaamse auteurs (1985)

1924 births
2014 deaths
Flemish writers
Ark Prize of the Free Word winners